Taddesse Tamrat (4 August 1935 – 23 May 2013) was an Ethiopian historian and scholar of Ethiopian studies. He is best known as the author of Church and State in Ethiopia  1270–1520 (1972, Oxford University Press ), a book which has dominated the field of Ethiopian studies.

Biography
Taddesse Tamrat was born in Addis Ababa from a family belonged to Ethiopian Orthodox Church clerks. He received an education through the traditional system of the Ethiopian Orthodox Church, where he was ordained as a deacon. As a young man he studied at Holy Trinity Cathedral in Addis Ababa, but his father insisted that he study at a more traditional church school to properly learn the Ge’ez language. He returned to Addis Ababa and graduated from Haile Selassie I University with a Bachelor of Arts at History in 1962. Following that, he received a scholarship to the School of Oriental and African Studies in London where he earned his doctorate in history. As a student there, he presented a seminar paper of some notes on the fifteenth century Stefanite heresy in the Ethiopian Church, which on the advice of his mentors Roland Oliver and Edward Ullendorf was submitted to and published in Rassegna di Studi Etiopici, his first article published outside of Ethiopia. It demonstrated his rich grounding in traditional Ethiopian Orthodox sources and his interaction with the broader academic world.

He taught history at Haile Selassie I University, which became Addis Ababa University after the 1974 revolution. He became the director of the Institute of Ethiopian Studies at the university and was active in the organizing the meetings of the International Conference of Ethiopian Studies.

He received the Medal of Honor at the Colège de France and was named an Honorary Fellow at the School of Oriental and African Studies. The Manuscript Department of the Institute of Ethiopian Studies was named in his honor. He and his wife of 45 years, Almaz, had a marriage that was admired by others. 

During the later years, Taddesse was treating his illness in hospital at Chicago. His wife of 45 years died in July 2012. He died on 23 May 2013, and survived by his three daughters.

References

1935 births
2013 deaths
Alumni of SOAS University of London
Academic staff of Addis Ababa University
Ethiopian Orthodox Christians
Ethiopianists
Ethiopian historians
Addis Ababa University alumni